Boltongate is a village in Cumbria, England. It is located just outside the Lake District National Park.

All Saints' Church has a stone tunnel-vaulted roof said to be the only one of its kind in England. It is a fortified church thought to have been strengthened to resist Scottish reivers or raiders. The nearby rectory incorporates a 15th-century pele tower.

Governance
Boltongate is part of the Workington constituency of the  UK parliament. The current Member of Parliament for the Workington constituency is Mark Jenkinson, who is a member of the Conservative Party. The Conservative Party won the seat in 2019 from Labour, who had held the constituency since 1979. This is only the second time the Conservative Party has represented Workington since World War II, the other being after the 1976 Workington by-election.

For local government purposes it is in the Boltons Ward of Allerdale Borough Council, and part of the Thursby Ward of Cumbria County Council.

The village has its own Parish Council, the Boltons Parish Council.

See also

Listed buildings in Boltons

References

External links

Villages in Cumbria
Allerdale